Shamdasani may refer to:

Sonu Shamdasani (born 1962), Singapore-born author, editor, and reader at the Wellcome Trust Centre for the History of Medicine at University College London
Anita Moorjani (born Anita Shamdasani, 1959), Singapore-born British author and cancer survivor

Sources
 Bherumal Mahirchand Advani, "'Amilan Jo Ahwal"- published in Sindhi, 1919
 Amilan Jo Ahwal (1919) - Translated into English ("A History of the Amils", 2016) at Sindhis
 Sindhi heritage: family trees and stories''' at   Sindhi Heritage